Carbonneau is a French surname. Notable people with the surname include:

Guy Carbonneau (born 1960), Canadian professional ice hockey player
Jacques Carbonneau (born 1928), Canadian Olympic cross-country skier
Onésiphore Carbonneau (1852–1932), Canadian merchant and political figure in Quebec
Philippe Carbonneau (born 1971), French rugby player

See also 
Carbonneau (grape), another name for the French wine grape Douce noir
Guy Carbonneau Trophy
Charbonneau (disambiguation)

French-language surnames